Abhishek Sharma (born 30 May 1983), popularly known by his screen name Krushna Abhishek, is an Indian actor, comedian and television host from Mumbai, Maharashtra. He is notable for his humours work in comedy shows on Indian television such as Comedy circus, Comedy nights bachao and The Kapil Sharma Show.

He gained fame as a comedian after participating in Comedy Circus show's several seasons on Sony TV. He also participated in dance reality shows, including Nach Baliye 3 (2007) and Jhalak Dikhhla Jaa 4 (2010). His dance moves are greatly inspired by his maternal uncle, former leading Bollywood actor Govinda. 

He has hosted Entertainment ke liye kuch bhi karega, OMG! Yeh Mera India, Comedy nights bachao, Comedy Nights Live shows on Sony tv, History TV18, Colors TV respectively. He also performs live stage shows.

Early life
Abhishek Sharma was born to Atmaprakash Sharma from Himachal Pradesh and  Punjabi mother in Mumbai on 30 May 1983. Actor Govinda is his maternal uncle. 1940s- 1950s Hindi film actor Arun Kumar Ahuja was his maternal grandfather and singer Nirmala Devi was his maternal grandmother. His mother named him after her favourite actor Amitabh Bachchan's son, Abhishek.

Personal life
Krushna Abhishek is married to his long time girlfriend Kashmira Shah and they live in Mumbai.

Career
He made his Hindi film debut with Yeh Kaisi Mohabbat Hai (2002), and has acted in films like Hum Tum Aur Mother in 2005, Jahan Jaaeyega Hamen Paaeyega (2007), and Aur Pappu Pass Ho Gaya in the same year. Later he shifted to Bhojpuri films. He played the lead in the TV series, Sautela (Doordarshan) in 2007.

He participated in various seasons of stand-up comedy show, Comedy Circus, including, Comedy Circus 2 (2008), Comedy Circus 3 (2009), where he was a wild card entry in Comedy Circus 3 (2009) with Sudesh Lehri.

He participated in the celebrity couple dance-reality shows, starting with Nach Baliye (Season 3) (2007), and Kabhi Kabhii Pyaar Kabhi Kabhii Yaar (2008) along with Kashmera Shah and eventually won the latter. He also appeared in a similar show, Jalwa Four 2 Ka 1 (2008). In 2010, he participated in the dance reality show, Jhalak Dikhhla Jaa (Season 4) with choreographer Robin Merchant. Previously he had also appeared as a judge in the reality dance show on DD National, Krazzy Kiya Re, along with Sudha Chandran.

As a celebrity couple, he and Kashmera Shah took part in the reality show Love Lock Up on UTV Bindass in February 2011, in which actress Priyanka Chopra played the role of peace maker. 

In 2016, he hosted and performed in Comedy Nights Live show of Colors TV, produced by Vipul D. Shah. It replaced popularity declined Comedy Nights with Kapil (2013-16) of Kapil Sharma. Later when the show itself got replaced Comedy Nights Bachao (2015-17) he hosted it and did comedy. 

In July 2017, he singed Sony TV's The Drama Company show produced by Kapil Sharma's former longtime girlfriend Preeti Simoes and her sister Neeti Simoes. 

In 2018, he joined the second season of The Kapil Sharma Show along with Sudesh Lehri, whom he collaborated with in Comedy Circus as well, after the first season closed down due to Kapil Sharma's poor health and mid-air altercations with supporting actors.

In 2020, he starred in his new show Funhit Mein Jaari with Bharti Singh and others. 

In 2022, he launched the latest season of his History TV18's Infotainment show 'OMG! Ye mera India'''. Till 2021 he has hosted 7 season of this show.

Filmography
 Television 
{| class="wikitable sortable"
|-
! Year
! Show
! Role(s)
|-
|1996 
|Just Mohabbat|Vishal
|-
|2007
|Nach Baliye 3|Contestant
|-
|2007
|Sautela|Yogank
|-
|2008
|Kabhi Kabhii Pyaar Kabhi Kabhii Yaar|Contestant 
|-
|2008–2014
|Comedy Circus|Various Characters 
|-
| rowspan="2" | 2008
|Jalwa Four 2 Ka 1|Contestant
|-
|Krazzy Kiya Re|Judge
|-
| rowspan="2" | 2010
|Comedy Ka Daily Soap|Host
|-
|Jhalak Dikhla Jaa 4|Contestant
|-
|2011
|Love Lock Up| Guest
|-
|2013
|Nadaniyaan|Narrator
|-
| rowspan="6" |2014
|Boogie Woogie Kids Championship|Guest
|-
|Gangs of Haseepur|Contestant
|-
|Mad in India|Host
|-
|MAX Fully Deewana Contest| Various Characters
|-
|Entertainment Ke Liye Kuch Bhi Karega|Host
|-
|Badi Door Se Aaye Hain|Jugnu 
|-
| 2014–15
|Comedy Classes|Various Characters
|-
| 2015
|Killerr Karaoke Atka Toh Latkah|Host
|-
|2015–2017
|Comedy Nights Bachao|Various Characters
|-
| rowspan="2" | 2016
|Comedy Nights Live|Pappu Singh
|-
|Bigg Boss 10|Guest
|-
| 2016
|OMG! Yeh Hai Mera India|rowspan="2" |Host
|-
|2017
|India Banega Manch|-
| 2017
|Bittu Bak Bak || Teacher
|-
|2017–2018
|The Drama Company|rowspan="2" | Various Characters
|-
|2018–2021
|The Kapil Sharma Show|-
|2019
|Bigg Boss 13|Guest
|-
|2020–2021
|Funhit Mein Jaari|Various Characters
|-
|2020
|Bigg Boss 14|rowspan="2" |Guest
|-
|2022
|Big Boss 16
|}

Films

Awards 

Indian Telly Award for Best Actor in a Comic Role (2014) for Comedy Circus
Indian Television Academy Award for Popular Comedy-Duo (2015) with Sudesh Lehri for Comedy Circus
BIG Star Most Entertaining Jury/Host (TV)-Non Fiction (2015) with Bharti Singh for Comedy Nights Bachao
ITA Award for Best Actor in a Comic Role (2019) for The Kapil Sharma Show

References

External links 

 
 

Indian male film actors
Male actors in Hindi cinema
Living people
Male actors from Mumbai
Participants in Indian reality television series
Reality show winners
Male actors in Bhojpuri cinema
Indian male television actors
1983 births
21st-century Indian male actors